Charles Ernest Henry Hickey (10 April 1880 – 9 June 1919) was a New Zealand cricketer who played first-class cricket for Wellington from 1903 to 1910.

Personal life
Hickey was born in Wellington, the son of a prominent local journalist and editor, M. C. Hickey. He became a businessman in Wellington. 

Hickey married Amy Eversleigh in Wellington in June 1908. She died on 27 May 1909 after a short illness. He died after an illness in June 1919. Their daughter survived them.

Cricket career
Hickey was a slow leg-spin bowler who was prominent in Wellington club cricket for the Phoenix and East clubs in the years before the First World War.  His success for East held back the early career of his club teammate, fellow leg-spinner Clarrie Grimmett.

His best first-class bowling figures were 4 for 50 and 3 for 36 in Wellington's victory over Canterbury in 1909-10. In a two-day non-first-class match between Wellington and Nelson in Wellington in December 1902, Hickey, bowling unchanged throughout the first innings, took 9 for 27, puzzling the Nelson batsmen with his slow leg-breaks. His batting was seldom productive, but he did score 35 to give Wellington a chance of victory in the Plunket Shield match against Auckland in 1910-11.

References

External links

1880 births
1919 deaths
New Zealand cricketers
Wellington cricketers
Cricketers from Wellington City